Hollow Meadows is the eighth solo album by British singer-songwriter Richard Hawley, released on 11 September 2015. It is his second record on the Parlophone label. As with his previous albums, the title refers to an area of his native Sheffield; Hollow Meadows is a hamlet on the outskirts of the city.

Development
After promotion had completed on his previous record Standing at the Sky's Edge, Hawley worked on the soundtrack for the film Love is All. Hawley wrote much of the album while recovering from a broken leg and slipped disc. Hawley referred to the song "Sometimes I Feel" as a turning point during the album's sessions. Much of what ended up on the album are the raw demos, which Hawley says helped keep the record "small." The vocal tracks sound particularly weary and ragged in comparison to previous albums, Hawley's usual smooth baritone frequently breaking.

Track listing

Charts

Weekly charts

Year-end charts

References

2015 albums
Richard Hawley albums
Parlophone albums